Smarididae is a family of mites belonging to the order Trombidiformes. These large predatory mites have long oval bodies, distinctively pointed in front. They are usually red and densely hairy with slender legs, sometimes very long. They have either one or two pairs of eyes.

Fossil record 

References

Further reading 
Nine new species of the superfamily Erythraeoidea (Acarina: Trombidiformes) associated with plants in South Africa, Magdalena K.P. Meyer & P.A.J. Ryke, Acarologia I

Trombidiformes
Acari families